Jubilee Park may refer to:

 Jubilee Park, Mackay, Queensland, Australia
 Jubilee Park, Melbourne, a cricket stadium in Victoria, Australia; see 2017–18 Women's National Cricket League season
 Jubelpark, in Brussels, Belgium
 A public park in Woodhall Spa, Lincolnshire, England
 A public park above the Canary Wharf tube station in London, England
 A public park in the London Borough of Enfield, England
 Leyton Jubilee Park, London, England
 Jubilee Park, Jamshedpur, a public park in Tatanagar, India
 Jubilee Park, a public park in Normandale, New Zealand
 A play area in Glynn, Northern Ireland
 An outdoor play area in Fort Canning Park, Singapore
 Jubilee Park, Dallas, a neighborhood in Dallas, Texas, United States

See also
 Sultan Haji Hassanal Bolkiah Silver Jubilee Park, Bandar Seri Begawan, Brunei
 Jubilee Parkway, Mobile, Alabama